Elmira Karapetyan (born 18 May 1994) is an Armenian sports shooter. She competed in the women's 10 metre air pistol event at the 2020 Summer Olympics.

References

External links
 

1994 births
Living people
Armenian female sport shooters
Olympic shooters of Armenia
Shooters at the 2020 Summer Olympics
Sportspeople from Yerevan